Indian Head Park is a village in Cook County, Illinois, United States, slightly north of the intersection of Interstate 294 and Interstate 55. The village is south of Western Springs, west of Countryside, north and east of Burr Ridge. Per the 2020 census, the population was 4,065. The village's ZIP code is 60525 (La Grange).

Geography

Demographics
As of the 2020 census there were 4,065 people, 1,637 households, and 984 families residing in the village. The racial makeup of the village was 87.23% White, 2.51% African American, 0.17% Native American, 3.17% Asian, 0.00% Pacific Islander, 1.70% from other races, and 5.22% from two or more races. Hispanic or Latino of any race were 6.91% of the population.

There were 1,637 households, out of which 35.43% had children under the age of 18 living with them, 54.18% were married couples living together, 5.38% had a female householder with no husband present, and 39.89% were non-families. 35.61% of all households were made up of individuals, and 22.66% had someone living alone who was 65 years of age or older. The average household size was 2.80 and the average family size was 2.13.

The village's age distribution consisted of 16.0% under the age of 18, 3.6% from 18 to 24, 17.9% from 25 to 44, 25.6% from 45 to 64, and 37.1% who were 65 years of age or older. The median age was 55.3 years. For every 100 females, there were 84.6 males. For every 100 females age 18 and over, there were 80.3 males.

The median income for a household in the village was $88,496, and the median income for a family was $123,032. Males had a median income of $76,577 versus $43,375 for females. The per capita income for the village was $53,926. About 2.3% of families and 3.0% of the population were below the poverty line, including 1.3% of those under age 18 and 7.6% of those age 65 or over.

Note: the US Census treats Hispanic/Latino as an ethnic category. This table excludes Latinos from the racial categories and assigns them to a separate category. Hispanics/Latinos can be of any race.

Government
The village president of Indian Head Park is Tom Hinshaw.  Indian Head Park is in Illinois's 3rd congressional district.

History

The first Democratic Convention of Cook County was held in the area in 1835. At that time, Indian Head Park was closer to the center of the county, as Cook County then encompassed all of present-day DuPage and parts of Will and Lake counties.  During that time the area was known as Lyonsville.

Just north of the village, now on the site of the Timber Trails subdivision, is one of the last camps of the Potawatomi Indians in Illinois.

The Lyonsville Congregational Church on the corner of Joliet and Wolf roads was once a stop on the Underground Railroad.

The Village of Indian Head Park was incorporated on August 4, 1959.

On October 27, 2011, Kelli O'Laughlin, a 14-year-old freshman at Lyons Township High School, was murdered. She was stabbed to death in an apparent burglary. This is believed to be the first murder in Indian Head Park history.

Notable people

 David McAfee (1947–2005), member of the Illinois House of Representatives from 1991 to 1995. He was a resident of Indian Head Park. 	
 Gabrielle Walsh (born 1989), actress. She was a childhood resident of Indian Head Park.

References

External links
Village of Indian Head Park official website

Villages in Illinois
Villages in Cook County, Illinois
Chicago metropolitan area
Populated places established in 1959
Populated places on the Underground Railroad
1959 establishments in Illinois